The 2022 Latvian Higher League, known as the Optibet Virslīga for sponsorship reasons, was the 31st season of top-tier football in Latvia. The season began on 11 March 2022 and ended on 12 November 2022. RFS were the defending champions after winning the league the previous season.

Teams
No teams were relegated at the end of the previous season. The league consists of 7 clubs from the previous season, joined by 3 teams from 1. līga - champions FK Auda, second place Tukums and third place SK Super Nova all were promoted.

Managers

Managerial changes

League table

Fixtures and results

Rounds 1–18

Rounds 19–36

Statistics

Top goalscorers

Hat-tricks 

Notes(H) – Home team(A) – Away team

Play-offs

See also
 2022 Latvian Football Cup

References

External links

Latvian Higher League seasons
1
Latvia
Latvia